The Presidio de San Bernardino, or Camp San Berdardino Springs was originally the site of a Spanish fortress built in 1776 and abandoned in 1780. It was located a few miles east of present-day Douglas, Arizona (Gerald 1968). In 1883, a temporary post was established by the United States Army at or near the presidio site and was known as Camp San Bernardino Springs. Camp Douglas was built next to Douglas in 1910 and should not be confused with the earlier posts or Camp San Bernardino Ranch, which was built near Bernardino, Arizona in 1911.

References

 Gerald, Rex (1968). Spanish Presidios of the Late Eighteenth Century in Northern New Spain. Museum of New Mexico Press, Santa Fe. 

Archaeological sites in Arizona
Buildings and structures in Cochise County, Arizona
History of Cochise County, Arizona
San Bernardino
1883 establishments in Arizona Territory
1776 establishments in New Spain